Nyambwezi Falls are a waterfall located in the North-Western Province of Zambia. Close to the lip of the falls, there is a rock shelter, which has petroglyphs and other evidence of late Stone Age occupation.

References

Waterfalls of Zambia
Rock art in Africa
Archaeological sites in Zambia
Geography of North-Western Province, Zambia
Archaeological sites of Eastern Africa